Oplitis is a genus of mites in the family Trachyuropodidae. There are more than 70 described species in Oplitis.

Species
These 74 species belong to the genus Oplitis:

 Oplitis alophora (Berlese, 1903)
 Oplitis angustifolia Hirschmann, 1984
 Oplitis athiasae Hirschmann & Zirngiebl-Nicol, 1973
 Oplitis attaae Hirschmann, 1972
 Oplitis baloghisimilis Hirschmann & Zirngiebl-Nicol, 1973
 Oplitis barbata Hiramatsu, 1978
 Oplitis belizensis Hirschmann, 1991
 Oplitis berleseiphiloctena Hirschmann, 1991
 Oplitis camponoti Hirschmann, 1991
 Oplitis castrii Hirschmann & Zirngiebl-Nicol, 1973
 Oplitis castriisimilis Hirschmann & Zirngiebl-Nicol, 1973
 Oplitis circularis Hiramatsu, 1978
 Oplitis conspicua (Berlese, 1903)
 Oplitis cornelli Hirschmann, 1991
 Oplitis cristobalensis Hirschmann, 1991
 Oplitis cubana Hirschmann, 1991
 Oplitis daressalami Wisniewski, 1980
 Oplitis dictyoeides Hirschmann & Zirngiebl-Nicol, 1973
 Oplitis dimidiata Hirschmann, 1991
 Oplitis dimitiatasimilis Hirschmann & Wisniewski, 1991
 Oplitis ellipsoides Hirschmann, 1991
 Oplitis endrodyi Zirngiebl & Hirshcmann, 1973
 Oplitis euchroeana Hirschmann & Wisniewski, 1991
 Oplitis exopodi Hunter & Farrier, 1975
 Oplitis farrieri Gorirossi Bourdaeu, 1993
 Oplitis floreanae Hirschmann, 1991
 Oplitis fofanai Hirschmann, 1991
 Oplitis franzi Hirschmann & Zirngiebl-Nicol, 1969
 Oplitis ghanaovalis Zirngiebl & Hirschmann, 1973
 Oplitis guineae Hirschmann, 1991
 Oplitis hallidayi Kontschán, 2013
 Oplitis hiramatsui Wisniewski, 1979
 Oplitis hirschmanni Wisniewski, 1979
 Oplitis irae Hirschmann, 1984
 Oplitis labyrinthi Hirschmann, 1984
 Oplitis lapidaria Hirschmann, 1991
 Oplitis lasiocornelli Hirschmann, 1991
 Oplitis lasiorum Hirschmann, 1991
 Oplitis latifolia Hirschmann, 1984
 Oplitis latotutuli Hirschmann, 1984
 Oplitis leonardiana (Berlese, 1903)
 Oplitis maeandralis Hirschmann & Zirngiebl, 1973
 Oplitis marginalis Hirschmann, 1991
 Oplitis mayae Hirschmann, 1991
 Oplitis minutissima (Berlese, 1903)
 Oplitis moseri Hirschmann, 1972
 Oplitis oblita Hirschmann, 1991
 Oplitis ootutuli Hirschmann, 1984
 Oplitis ovatula (Berlese, 1903)
 Oplitis paradoxa G.Canestrini, 1884
 Oplitis pecinai Hirschmann, 1984
 Oplitis pecki Hirschmann, 1991
 Oplitis peckisimilis
 Oplitis philocenta (Trouessart, 1902)
 Oplitis philoctena (Trouessart, 1902)
 Oplitis pusaterii Kontschán, 2012
 Oplitis radiata Hirschmann, 1984
 Oplitis reticulata Zirngiebl & Hirschmann, 1973
 Oplitis ricasoliana (Berlese, 1903)
 Oplitis sarcinulus Hunter & Farrier, 1976
 Oplitis schmitzi (Kneissl, 1908)
 Oplitis solmani
 Oplitis stammeri Hirschmann & Zirngiebl-Nicol, 1961
 Oplitis subcorticalis
 Oplitis szunyeghyi
 Oplitis termitophila Zirngiebl & Hirschmann, 1973
 Oplitis ticumbi
 Oplitis tutuli Hirschmann, 1984
 Oplitis uncinata Zirngiebl & Hirschmann, 1973
 Oplitis uvsnuurensis
 Oplitis wasmanni (Kneissl, 1907)
 Oplitis wisniewskii Hirschmann, 1984
 Oplitis woelkei Hirschmann, 1975
 Oplitis zavattarii Valle, 1955

References

Mesostigmata
Articles created by Qbugbot